Sukla Charan Noatia is an Indian politician from Tripura. He is the Minister of Cooperation, Tribal Welfare (TRP & PTG), Welfare of Minorites in the Government of Tripura as part of the Second Saha Ministry. He became the MLA from Jolaibari Assembly constituency by defeating Debendra Tripura of Communist Party of India (Marxist) by a margin of 375 votes in 2023.

References 

Living people
State cabinet ministers of Tripura
Tripura MLAs 2023–2028
Tripura politicians
Indigenous Peoples Front of Tripura politicians